Inverquharity is a Roman fortlet in Scotland, close to the Highland Line about  north of Kirriemuir, Angus.

Although very little archaeological work has taken place, it is assumed that Inverquharity forms part of the Roman occupation during the Flavian period; this would mean it was constructed sometime between 70 and 86 CE. It would thus form part of the series of Strathmore forts, which include Inchtuthil, Cargill I and II, Cardean and Stracathro. Inverquharity is, with Cargill II, one of the smaller installations. Its position close to the Highland line and in a mouth of a small valley, justifies its inclusion amongst the Glenblocker forts.

Aerial photography and geophysical study have shown Inverquharity to have two ditches, of which at least one has been eroded or the sand cliff on which it is situated. Nothing is known about its internal structures.

References
D.Breeze, Northern Frontiers of Roman Britain (1982)
D.Breeze, Roman Scotland (2007)
W.S.Hanson, G.Maxwell, Rome's North-west Frontier: The Antonine Wall (1986)
D.J.Woolliscroft, B.Hoffmann, The First Frontier. Rome in the North of Scotland (Stroud: Tempus 2006)

External links

 The Roman Gask Project
 romanbritain.org
 Britannia-The Roman army and navy in Britain 55BC -410AD

Buildings and structures completed in the 1st century
Archaeological sites in Angus, Scotland
70s establishments in the Roman Empire
80s establishments in the Roman Empire
1st-century establishments in Scotland
Scheduled monuments in Scotland
Roman auxiliary forts in Scotland